Robert A. Bernstein (born March 22, 1961, in Worcester, Massachusetts) is an American attorney and politician who represented the First Worcester District in the Massachusetts Senate from 1995 to 2001.

References

1961 births
Living people
Democratic Party Massachusetts state senators
Politicians from Worcester, Massachusetts
Franklin & Marshall College alumni
Georgetown University Law Center alumni
Massachusetts lawyers
Democratic Party members of the Massachusetts House of Representatives